Skippy is a 1931 American pre-Code comedy film about the scrappy boy portrayed in the popular comic strip and novel Skippy by Percy Crosby. The screenplay was by Joseph L. Mankiewicz, Don Marquis, Norman Z. McLeod, and Sam Mintz.

The film stars Jackie Cooper in the title role, Robert Coogan, Mitzi Green and Jackie Searl. Director Norman Taurog won the Academy Award for Best Director (at age 32, he remained the youngest winner in this category until Damien Chazelle won for the 2016 film La La Land). The film also did well enough to inspire a sequel called Sooky (1931). Skippy was released on April 5, 1931, by Paramount Pictures. 
For his performance, Cooper, at the age of nine, became the youngest person to earn an Academy Award nomination for Best Actor in a Leading Role. The film was also nominated for the Academy Award for Best Picture.

Plot

Skippy (Jackie Cooper) is the feisty son of the strict Dr. Herbert Skinner (Willard Robertson) and his wife Ellen (Enid Bennett). Skinner forbids his son Skippy to play in the pauperized Shantytown, because of the unhygienic and criminal surroundings there. But Skippy and his friend Sidney (Jackie Searl) still go to Shantytown where Skippy meets a new boy named Sooky (Robert Coogan, Jackie Coogan's little brother). He saves the small boy Sooky from the much bigger bully Harley Nubbins (Donald Haines). Skippy and Sooky become friends. One day Harley accidentally breaks the windshield of his father's car with Skippy's yo-yo. Harley, who has a very aggressive and brute father, blames it on Skippy and Sooky. Mr. Nubbins (Jack Rube Clifford), who works as a dog catcher, takes Sooky's dog and demands that they pay him for the damages if they want their dog back. The boys gather three dollars by breaking Skippy's savings bank, but Mr. Nubbins accepts it only for his windshield. He gives them three days to get another three dollars for a dog license and he threatens that he'll kill their dog if they don't get the money.

Sooky and Skippy spend the next two days selling bottles, lemonade and wood, and staging a performance to earn money. Skippy's father doesn't want to lend them the remaining thirty cents. Then Mr. Nubbins kills their dog and Skippy blames his father for it. The next morning, Skippy gets a new bicycle from his father. But he trades the bicycle to his friend, Eloise (Mitzi Green), for her new dog. Skippy takes the dog to Sooky. Dr. Skinner has a change of heart and buys Sooky a licensed dog, finds his mother a job, and refrains from ordering Shantytown destroyed, instead offering assistance to its citizens. For the first time, Dr. Skinner plays with Skippy in Shantytown. There they accidentally break Mr. Nubbins' new windshield. Dr. Skinner wins a fight against Mr. Nubbins and shows that he is a good father.

Cast
Jackie Cooper as Skippy Skinner
Robert Coogan as Sooky Wayne
Mitzi Green as Eloise
Jackie Searl as Sidney
Willard Robertson as Dr. Herbert Skinner
Enid Bennett as Mrs. Ellen Skinner
Donald Haines as Harley Nubbins
Jack Rube Clifford as Mr. Nubbins, Dog-Catcher
Helen Jerome Eddy as Mrs. Wayne
Guy Oliver as Dad Burkey

Production
In the scene where the dog dies, director Norman Taurog needed to get his nephew, Jackie Cooper, to cry, so he told young Jackie that he was going to kill his own dog. Jackie did the scene and afterward found out his dog would be unharmed. From this point on, Jackie had mixed feelings toward his uncle, almost to the point of hatred, and rarely spoke to him again.

References

External links

1931 films
1931 comedy-drama films
American comedy-drama films
American black-and-white films
1930s English-language films
Films about children
Films based on American comics
Films based on comic strips
Films directed by Norman Taurog
Films whose director won the Best Directing Academy Award
Films with screenplays by Joseph L. Mankiewicz
Live-action films based on comics
Paramount Pictures films
1930s American films